Pietro Sessa (1927–1993) was an Italian rower. He competed at the 1948 Summer Olympics in London with the men's eight where they were eliminated in the semi-final.

References

1927 births
1993 deaths
Italian male rowers
Olympic rowers of Italy
Rowers at the 1948 Summer Olympics
European Rowing Championships medalists